Otto Claussen Iberri (born 10 February 1964) is a Mexican politician from the Institutional Revolutionary Party. From 2009 to 2012 he served as Deputy of the LIX Legislature of the Congress of Sonora. During his time as a mayor municipal president he managed to repair and paved over 300 boulevards and streets in Guaymas, Sonora. During his governance Guaymas was consider the 2nd safest city in Mexico.

Personal life
His father, Enrique Clausen Bustillos, also served as Mayor of Guaymas.

References

1964 births
Living people
People from Guaymas
Politicians from Sonora
Members of the Congress of Sonora
Institutional Revolutionary Party politicians
21st-century Mexican politicians
Municipal presidents in Sonora